Palo may refer to:

Places
 Palo, Argentina, a village in Argentina
 Palo, Estonia, village in Meremäe Parish, Võru County, Estonia
 Palo, Huesca, municipality in the province of Huesca, Spain
 Palo, Iowa, United States, a town located within Linn County
 Palo Laziale, Italy, an old location in the comune of Ladispoli, Lazio, Italy
 Palo, Leyte, a 3rd class municipality in Philippines
 Palo, Minnesota, United States, a community located in St. Louis County, between Makinen and Aurora, Minnesota
 Palo, Saskatchewan, Canada, a hamlet located within Rosemount Rural Municipality No. 378

People with the surname
 Marko Palo, Finnish ice hockey player
 Tauno Palo, Finnish actor

Other uses
 Palo (OLAP database), an open source MOLAP database
 Palo (religion), developed by slaves from Central Africa in Cuba
 PALO!, an Afro-Cuban funk band
 Palo (flamenco), the name for a musical form in flamenco
 PALO, Linux bootloader for HP-PA systems
 Palo (:th:พะโล้), a stew with five-spice powder in Thai.
 Palos, long drums used in the music of the Dominican Republic
 Palo, an album by the Finnish band Kalmah